Up (Original Motion Picture Soundtrack) is the film score to the 2009 Disney-Pixar film of the same name composed by Michael Giacchino. This is his third feature film for Pixar after The Incredibles and Ratatouille. Giacchino wrote a character theme-based score that the filmmakers felt enhanced the story of the film. Up received positive reviews from music critics and won major awards. Despite being well regarded, Up was not released as a compact disc (CD) until 2011, when it became available via Intrada Records.

The score album was nominated to multiple awards. It earned two Grammy Awards: Best Score Soundtrack Album for a Motion Picture, Television or Other Visual Media and Best Instrumental Composition for "Married Life", at the 2010 ceremony. The score also won the Golden Globe Award for Best Original Score at 67th Golden Globe Awards, the Academy Award for Best Original Score at the 82nd Academy Awards, and the BAFTA Award for Best Film Music. Up was the first Disney film since Pocahontas to win the Academy Award for Best Original Score, spanning a gap of 14 years, and the first Pixar film to win the award. It also became one of few scores to win an Oscar, a Golden Globe, a BAFTA, and a Grammy.

Composition
The type of compositional technique used on the score is called thematic transformation, a technique commonly used in large-scaled classical music compositions, in which more than one theme is involved and related together in a single piece of music.

Critical reception

The score received positive reviews from music critics. "Throughout the soundtrack, Giacchino keeps things fresh with his engaging melodies and variations, and Up succeeds as an old-fashioned score that doesn’t shy away from emotion or catchy tunes.", was the positive review from iTunes. Christopher Coleman, from tracksounds.com, gave the score 8 out of 10 stars, commenting: "The experience of his [Giacchino's] original score went from mediocre to marvelous with a single viewing of the film".

Danny Graydon, Empire writer, declared "Giacchino's primary theme moves from the jaunty jazz flourish of the opening titles" ... "The score's emotional content is further fuelled by two similarly flexible (albeit more subtle) themes". Christian Clemmensen of Filmtracks.com awarded the score a four star rating out of five, but wrote a mixed review: "In general, the vintage jazz and Waltz combination is effective in raising the spirit of adventure specifically from the perspective of an elderly man, but this material could potentially sound geriatric to some listeners seeking only loftier fantasy elements". Regarding Disney's initial decision to not release the score on compact disc, Clemmensen went on to say "Unfortunately, with a score as dynamic in instrumental range as Up, hearing it in compressed MP3 form is simply unacceptable. This format may work for headphones, but the recording sounds dull and flat on any sizable stereo system."

Track listing

Album credits
Credits from Up notes:
Michael Giacchino – composer and additional orchestrations
Tim Simonec – orchestration and conductor
Dan Wallin – sound recorder and mixer
Peter Boyer – additional orchestrations
Jack J. Hayes – additional orchestrations
Larry Kenton – additional orchestrations
Jennifer Hammond – additional orchestrations
Hollywood Studio Symphony – performance
Stephen Davis – music editor
Mark Willsher – music editor
Reggie Wilson – orchestra contractor
Andrea Datzman – score coordinator
Luis M. Rojas – cover art design

Charts

Release history

Accolades

References

2009 soundtrack albums
2000s film soundtrack albums
Classical music soundtracks
Pixar soundtracks
Soundtrack
Walt Disney Records soundtracks
Intrada Records soundtracks
Grammy Award for Best Score Soundtrack for Visual Media
Michael Giacchino soundtracks
Scores that won the Best Original Score Academy Award